Gérald Marie is a French former model agency boss, who headed Elite Model Management, in Paris.

In February 2021, 11 women who accused Marie of sexual misconduct and rape were invited to Paris to meet investigators. In July 2021, American model Carré Otis filed a complaint against him for allegedly raping her when she was 17. In August 2021, Otis filed a lawsuit alleging that he repeatedly raped her at his Paris apartment. At least 15 women have gone to French authorities with sexual assault allegations against him. His ex-wife, Canadian model Linda Evangelista, said she knew nothing about the reported alleged rapes and sexual assaults, during her relationship with him but believes the women who have come forward are telling the truth, and praised their courage.

On the 13th of February 2023, French prosecutors announced they had closed their criminal investigation into the rape and sexual assaults, allegedly committed by Marie during the 1980s and 1990s, on the grounds that under France's statute of limitations, the alleged offences had taken place too long ago to be prosecuted.

The decision to drop the criminal investigations did not prevent alleged victims from pursuing claims against Marie through the civil courts. Former BBC journalist, Lisa Brinkworth, is among alleged victims who said they would progress  civil cases against Gérald Marie. Brinkworth claims she was sexually assaulted in a Milan nightclub by Marie in 1998, while she was working uncover on a documentary investigation into sex crimes against fashion models. She also said she would be applealing the French criminal prosecutor's decision.

Career 
He was the president of Elite Model Management European division and was one of the most powerful men in fashion.

Personal life 
He was married to Canadian fashion model Linda Evangelista between 1987 and 1993.

See also 
 Jeffrey Epstein

Notes

External links 
 Former models expose the ugly truth of the beauty industry | 60 Minutes Australia, YouTube

Living people
20th-century French businesspeople
French businesspeople in fashion
Year of birth missing (living people)